The 2013–14 Kansas State Wildcats women's basketball team will represent Kansas State University in the 2013–14 NCAA Division I women's basketball season. This is head coach Deb Patterson's eighteenth season at Kansas State. They play their home games at Bramlage Coliseum in Manhattan, Kansas and were members of the Big 12 Conference. They finish the season with a record of 11–19 overall, 5–13 in Big 12 play for a tie to finish in eighth place. They lost in the first round of the 2014 Big 12 Conference women's basketball tournament to in-state rival Kansas.

Roster

Schedule and results 
Sources:

|-
!colspan=9 style="background:#512888; color:#FFFFFF;"| Exhibition

|-
!colspan=9 style="background:#512888; color:#FFFFFF;"| Regular Season

|-
!colspan=9 style="background:#512888; color:#FFFFFF;"| 2014 Big 12 Conference women's basketball tournament

See also 
 2013–14 Kansas State Wildcats men's basketball team

References 

Kansas State Wildcats women's basketball seasons
Kansas State